Women in Skirts (Italian: Donne con le gonne) is a 1991 Italian romantic comedy film directed by Francesco Nuti. It was the highest-grossing Italian film in Italy in 1992. The film was nominated for two awards, Best Supporting Actress and Best Costume Design.

Cast 
 Francesco Nuti as Renzo Calabrese 
 Carole Bouquet as Margherita 
 Barbara Enrichi as Renzo's mother
 Cinzia Leone as Cinzia
 Gastone Moschin as lawyer Carabba 
 Didi Perego as Pubblico Ministero
 Daniele Dublino as count Ugolino

References

External links 
 

1991 films
Italian romantic comedy films
Films directed by Francesco Nuti
1991 romantic comedy films
1990s Italian-language films
1990s Italian films